In algebraic number theory, the Dedekind–Kummer theorem describes how a prime ideal in a Dedekind domain factors over the domain's integral closure.

Statement for number fields 
Then  factors into prime ideals assuch that .

Statement for Dedekind Domains 

See Neukirch.

References 

Algebraic number theory